The 2007 Barnsley Metropolitan Borough Council election took place on 3 May 2007 to elect members of Barnsley Metropolitan Borough Council in South Yorkshire, England. One third of the council was up for election and the Labour party stayed in overall control of the council.

Background

Prior to the election, a number of Barnsley Independent Group councillors had removed themselves from the grouping and sat as Independent. Those Independents had earlier lost a seat in a Penistone by-election to the Conservatives, and suffered a defection to Labour in St. Helens. The Conservatives had also suffered a defection to the BIG in Penistone West.

Election result
The results saw Labour retain a majority of 3 with 33 councillors, after losing 2 seats to the Barnsley Independent Group. The Barnsley Independent Group moved to 20 seats after ousting 2 long time Labour councillors Alan Schofield and Alex Vodden. The Conservatives remained on 5 seats, the Liberal Democrats 2 and 3 councillors were non-aligned. The British National Party failed to win any seats, but did come second in the wards of Central, Dearne North and Darton West. Overall turnout increased slightly to 33%.

This resulted in the following composition of the council:

Ward results

+/- figures represent changes from the last time these wards were contested.

References

2007 English local elections
2007
2000s in South Yorkshire